Jakhani Kalan is a village in Lambhua block of Sultanpur district, Uttar Pradesh, India. The population is 1,111 total according to the 2011 Census of India.

References

Villages in Sultanpur district